Nowruz Mahalleh (also Romanized as Nowrūz Maḩalleh, Nauroz Mahalleh, and Now Rūz Maḩalleh; also known as Norug-Makhala and Nowrūzī Maḩalleh) is a village in Deylaman Rural District, Deylaman District, Siahkal County, Gilan Province, Iran. At the 2006 census, its population was 224, in 57 families.

References 

Populated places in Siahkal County